Pascale Casanova (February 14, 1959 – September 29, 2018) was a French literary critic.

Life 
From 1997 to 2010, she was the author and editor of L'Atelier littéraire, a radio show on France Culture. 

She was a Visiting Professor in the Department of Romance Studies at Duke University.

Works 
 La republique mondiale des lettres, Paris : Editions du Seuil, 1999. , 
 Kafka en colère : essai, Paris : Seuil, DL 2011. , 
 La langue mondiale (The World Language), Paris, Seuil, 2015

Works in English
The World Republic of Letters, translator M B DeBevoise, Cambridge, Massachusetts ; London, England : Harvard University Press, 2007. ,  
 Kafka, angry poet translator Chris Turner, London ; New York : Seagull Books, 2015. , 
Samuel Beckett: Anatomy of a Literary Revolution. , 
 "Literature as a World", University of Pennsylvania

References

1959 births
2018 deaths
Duke University faculty
French writers
French literary critics